William Thom (1788 – 29 February 1848) was a Scottish poet who wrote in the Scots language. He was author of The Mitherless Bairn and other works. He was known as the "Inverury Poet".

Life and work
Thom was a native of Aberdeen, where he worked as a hand-loom weaver, enduring considerable hardship and poverty.

He was born in Sinclair's Close, Justice Port, Aberdeen, in 1799 or 1800.

His most notable work is Blind Boy's Pranks. In 1841 he published Rhymes and Recollections of a Handloom Weaver.

A biography of Thom appears in the book James Hogg by Sir George Douglas (Edinburgh: Oliphant, Anderson & Ferrier, 1899) in the Famous Scots Series.

Thom died in Dundee on 29 February 1848. According to the death record on the site scotlandspeople.gov.uk, Thom died of "consumption" and was interred on 3 March. He is interred at Western Cemetery, Dundee, where a memorial monument was erected by admirers of the poet.

References

1799 births
1848 deaths
People from Aberdeen
Writers from Aberdeen
19th-century Scottish poets
Scots-language poets
Poets associated with Dundee